Puente Río Cuale is a bridge along Puerto Vallarta's Malecón, spanning the Cuale River and connecting the city's Centro and Zona Romántica neighborhoods. The bridge also provides access to Isla Cuale.

See also

 List of bridges in Mexico

References

External links
 

Bridges in Mexico
Buildings and structures in Puerto Vallarta
Centro, Puerto Vallarta
Zona Romántica